The Hyundai Stargazer is a compact multi-purpose vehicle (MPV) produced by Hyundai Motor Company in Indonesia since 2022. The vehicle was first introduced on 15 July 2022 when the first units of the vehicle rolled off its assembly line at HMMI in Cikarang. It was launched and made its public debut at the 29th Gaikindo Indonesia International Auto Show on 11 August.

Markets

Indonesia 
For the Indonesian market, the Stargazer is available in four grade levels: Active, Trend, Style and Prime. The former two grades are available with either 6-speed manual or IVT transmission options, while the latter two grades are only available with IVT transmission as standard. Captains seats are optional for each grade except for the Active grade. Hyundai SmartSense driver-assistance system is standard for the Prime grade.

Vietnam 
In Vietnam, the Stargazer was launched on 20 October 2022. It is offered in Standard, Special and Premium grades. Captain seats are available as an option for the Premium grade. Hyundai SmartSense is standard for the Premium grade. Imported from Indonesia, local production will begin in 2023.

Philippines 
In the Philippines, the Stargazer was launched on 8 November 2022 and is offered in GL, GLS and GLS Premium grades. Hyundai SmartSense is standard for the GLS Premium grade.

Thailand 
In Thailand, the Stargazer was launched on 30 November 2022 at the 39th Thailand International Motor Expo.

Safety

Sales

References

External links 

  

Stargazer
Cars introduced in 2022
Compact MPVs
Front-wheel-drive vehicles
Vehicles with CVT transmission